The Suparco's spaceflight missions and tests were the sounding rocket launches of the Space Research Commission (SUPARCO) that were aimed for developing high-altitude rockets for Pakistan's space programme. The exploration programme provides opportunities for physics, atmospheric physics, investigations of the prevailing temperature gradients, wind velocities and density of the upper atmosphere. Since its inception, over 200 sounding rockets were launched by Suparco from 1962 till its partial termination in 1972.

Pakistan was first country among developing nations, Islamic world and in South Asia, third in Asia and tenth in the world to successfully launch a vessel into outer space with flight of Rehbar-I.

Originally, it has been a SUPARCO programme and is still active as of current. The space mission programme has taken over by various aerospace authorities and institutions, including many international collaborations, in the country. Since late 1980s, most of the tests have been involved in the research and development, followed by the physical testings of the ballistic missile  have also been conducted. Notable spaceflights of the launchers have included Rehbar-I, Shaheen-I/Shaheen-II, various Ghauri-II space boosters and missiles.

Spaceflight by year

Spacecraft by year

Recent testings and launch

December 10, 2001

Badr-B
Badr-B was Pakistan's second satellite. Built in collaboration with the English company SIL, it had a mass of 70 kg and carried an Earth imager.

May 25, 2002 - November 16, 2006

References

External links
Astronautix: Pakistan

Pakistan rocket test chronology
Nuclear history of Pakistan
SUPARCO missions
Pakistan rocket test chronology
Rocket test chronology